J. C. Humphrey was the founder of the Belleville Telescope, a newspaper in Republic County, Kansas.  It was the first paper in the county, established September 20, 1870, when there were only two houses in the town of Belleville.

Humphrey was born in Canada in 1845 and moved first to Ohio, then back to Canada, and finally arriving in Kansas to homestead in 1870.

References

1845 births
People from Belleville, Kansas
Year of death missing